The  is a subway line in Tokyo, Japan, operated by the Tokyo subway operator Toei Subway. The line is named after the Asakusa district, a cultural center of Tokyo, under which it passes.

The Asakusa Line was the first subway line in Japan to offer through services with a private railway. Today, it has more through services to other lines than any other subway line in Tokyo. Via its through services with Keisei and Keikyu, the Asakusa line is the only train line that offers a direct connection between Tokyo's two main airports.

The Asakusa Line is often split into two routes: Oshiage–Sengakuji and Sengakuji–Nishi-magome; only some trains make all station stops on the line, as many trains travel on the Keikyu Main Line south of Sengakuji.

On maps and signboards, the line is shown in the color rose. Stations carry the letter "A" followed by a two-digit number inside a more reddish vermilion circle.

Services
 Local (普通 futsū) trains operate between Nishi-Magome and Sengakuji approximately every ten minutes and are timed to connect to Keikyu through service trains at Sengakuji.
 Rapid service (快速 kaisoku) trains operate between Nishi-Magome and Keisei Sakura Station approximately every twenty minutes. They make all station stops on the Asakusa Line.
 Limited Express (快特 kaitoku) trains operate approximately every twenty minutes. They generally use Keikyu rolling stock and have a southern terminus at Misakiguchi Station or Keikyu Kurihama Station. They operate as Limited Express trains only on the Keikyu line, and provide local service on the Asakusa Line and Keisei Oshiage Line. Their northern terminus is generally either Aoto Station or Keisei Takasago Station, but select trains operate to Narita International Airport.
Their northern terminus is usually either Inzai-Makinohara Station or Inba-Nihon-Idai Station on the Hokuso Railway.
 Airport Limited Express (エアポート快特 eapōto kaitoku) trains operate approximately every twenty minutes, and skip certain stations while operating on the Asakusa Line. Their northern terminus alternates between "Access Express" (アクセス特急 akusesu tokkyū) service to Narita International Airport and Limited Express service to either Aoto or Takasago. The total travel time from Haneda Airport to Narita Airport on this train is approximately one hour and 46 minutes.

Station list 
 All stations are located in Tokyo.
 The Airport Limited Express/Access Express stops at stations marked "●", skips those marked "|". All other services stop at every station.

Rolling stock
A variety of rolling stock is in use due to the large number of through service operators on the line, all of which use standard gauge tracks and 1,500 V DC electrification via overhead lines. Currently, six operators run trains onto the Asakusa Line, the most of any Tokyo subway line, and the line is unique as the only subway line in Tokyo with through services onto standard gauge railways (all other through services are with narrow gauge lines).

Toei

 Toei 5500 series

Keisei Electric Railway

 Keisei 3000 series
 Keisei 3050 series
 Keisei 3100 series
 Keisei 3400 series
 Keisei 3600 series
 Keisei 3700 series

Keikyu

 Keikyu 600 series
 Keikyu N1000 series
 Keikyu 1500 series

Hokuso Railway

 Hokuso 7300 series
 Hokuso 7500 series

Chiba New Town Railway

 Chiba New Town Railway 9100 series
 Chiba New Town Railway 9200 series
 Chiba New Town Railway 9800 series

Shibayama Railway

 Shibayama 3600 series

Former rolling stock
 Toei 5000 series
 Toei 5200 series
 Toei 5300 series
 Keikyu 1000 series 
 Keisei 3000 series (original type)
 Keisei 3050 series (original type)
 Keisei 3100 series (original type)
 Keisei 3150 series
 Keisei 3200 series
 Keisei 3300 series
 Keisei 3500 series
 Hokuso 7000 series
 Hokuso 7050 series
 Hokuso 7150 series
 Hokuso 7250 series
 Hokuso 7260 series
 Chiba New Town Railway 9000 series

History 
The Toei Asakusa Line was the first subway line constructed by the Tokyo Metropolitan Government. The line number is Line 1, because it was technically the first subway line in Tokyo to be planned in the 1920s as an underground route connecting the Keikyu and Keisei Electric Railway via , eventually allowing for through trains between these two railways. In its original plan form, the line would have actually bypassed Asakusa Station entirely. However, the plan was changed to take advantage of the existing Tobu Isesaki Line (section now named as the Tobu Skytree Line) and Tokyo Metro Ginza Line connections at Asakusa.

Construction of this line began on 27 August 1956 after years of delays, and the initial  segment between Oshiage and Asakusabashi opened on 4 December 1960. The line then opened in stages from north to south:
 May 1962: Asakusabashi to Higashi-Nihombashi
 September 1962: Higashi-Nihombashi to Ningyōchō
 February 1963: Ningyōchō to Higashi-Ginza
 December 1963: Higashi-Ginza to Shimbashi
 October 1964: Shimbashi to Daimon
 June 1968: Daimon to Sengakuji (Through service with Keikyū begins)
 15 November 1968: Sengakuji to Nishi-Magome

The line was named Asakusa Line on 1 July 1978.

From 1998 to 2002, the Asakusa Line was used as part of a rail connection between Tokyo's two major airports, Haneda and Narita. While a few trains still run between the airports, the service has greatly diminished in frequency since 2002.

In 2005, a research group of government, metropolitan and railway company officials proposed that the Asakusa Line be connected to Tokyo Station via a spur to the north of Takarachō Station. This would provide Tokyo Station's first direct connection to the Toei subway network. It would also make it possible to reach Haneda Airport in 25 minutes (versus 35 minutes today) and Narita Airport in 40 minutes (versus 57 minutes today). This plan has yet to be finalized or formally adopted. Authorities are re-considering a similar plan as part of the infrastructure improvements for the 2020 Summer Olympics; the proposed line would cut travel time to Haneda from 30 minutes to 18 minutes, and to Narita from 55 minutes to 36 minutes, at a total cost of around 400 billion yen.

References

External links

 Bureau of Transportation, Tokyo Metropolitan Government 

 
Asakusa
Railway lines in Tokyo
Standard gauge railways in Japan
Railway lines opened in 1960
1500 V DC railway electrification
1960 establishments in Japan